Heinz Strüning (13 January 1912 – 24 December 1944) was a German Luftwaffe military aviator during World War II, a night fighter ace credited with 56 nocturnal aerial victories claimed in 280 combat missions. 

All of his victories were claimed over the Western Front in Defense of the Reich missions against the Royal Air Force's Bomber Command. He was shot down and killed in action on Christmas Eve, 24 December 1944.

Early life and career
Strüning was born on 13 January 1912 in Neviges, at the time in the Rhine Province of the German Empire. He was the son of electrician Karl Strüning. Following graduation from the Realgymnasium—a secondary school built on the mid-level Realschule—in Langenberg he began his vocational education as a merchant. In March 1935, he joined the Luftwaffe and was trained as a pilot.

Holding the rank of Unteroffizier, he was posted to 5. Staffel (5th squadron) of Zerstörergeschwader 26 "Horst Wessel" (ZG 26—26th Destroyer Wing), named after the Nazi martyr Horst Wessel, on 2 August 1939.

World War II
World War II in Europe began on Friday, 1 September 1939, when German forces invaded Poland. Flying with ZG 26, he flew several patrol missions on the Western Front during the Phoney War period. On 9 April 1940, the Wehrmacht launched Operation Weserübung, the German assault on Denmark and Norway. Two days later, Strüning was reassigned to the Zerstörrerstaffel of Kampfgeschwader 30 (KG 30—30th Bomber Wing). Until 9 June, he flew escort missions in support of the German troops at Narvik. For his service in Norway, he was awarded the Iron Cross second Class on 15 July 1940. On 1 August 1940, Strüning was promoted to Feldwebel (sergeant).

Night fighter career

Following the 1939 aerial Battle of the Heligoland Bight, Royal Air Force (RAF) attacks shifted to the cover of darkness, initiating the Defence of the Reich campaign. By mid-1940, Generalmajor (Brigadier General) Josef Kammhuber had established a night air defense system dubbed the Kammhuber Line. It consisted of a series of control sectors equipped with radars and searchlights and an associated night fighter. Each sector named a Himmelbett (canopy bed) would direct the night fighter into visual range with target bombers. In 1941, the Luftwaffe started equipping night fighters with airborne radar such as the Lichtenstein radar. This airborne radar did not come into general use until early 1942.

In July 1940, elements of (Z)KG 30 were trained and converted to flying night fighter missions. These elements then became the 4. Staffel in the II. Gruppe (2nd group) of the newly created Nachtjagdgeschwader 1 (NJG 1—1st Night Fighter Wing). On 11 September, II. Gruppe of NJG 1 was reassigned and became the I. Gruppe of Nachtjagdgeschwader 2 (NJG 2—2nd Night Fighter Wing), subsequently Strünning became a pilot of 1./NJG 2. Kammhuber had created I./NJG 2 with the idea of utilizing the Junkers Ju 88 C-2 and Dornier Do 17 Z as an offensive weapon, flying long range intruder missions into British airspace, attacking RAF airfields. Until October 1941, I. Gruppe operated from the Gilze-Rijen Air Base.

Two days later, he received the Iron Cross first Class. For his service in Norway, he was presented the Narvik Shield on 30 January 1941. Following his fifth aerial victory, he received the Honour Goblet of the Luftwaffe on 12 June 1941. On 1 July 1941, Strüning was promoted to Oberfeldwebel (Master Sergeant). He claimed his ninth and last intruder aerial victory on 13 October 1941 over a Boeing B-17 Flying Fortress in the vicinity of Upwood over England.

In the timeframe 24 October 1940, the date of I. Gruppes first aerial victory, to 12 October 1941, the intruder Gruppe claimed approximately 100 RAF aircraft destroyed, additionally further aircraft were damaged as well as RAF ground targets attacked. This came at the expense of 26 aircraft lost. In October 1941, Hitler ordered the intruder operations stopped as he was skeptical of the results. The unit was then ordered to Catania, Sicily in the Mediterranean theater of operations. Strüning however stayed at Gilze-Rijen and was transferred to the Ergänzungsjagdgruppe, a supplementary unit of NJG 2.

In November 1941, he was transferred to 7./NJG 2. With this unit, Strüning gained 15 victories until mid-September 1942. He received the German Cross in Gold in July 1942, after his 19th claim. In mid September 1942 he was promoted to Leutnant and awarded the Knight's Cross of the Iron Cross in October 1942. Strüning is then transferred to 2./NJG 1 in May 1943.

Staffelkapitän and death

Strüning was promoted to Oberleutnant (first lieutenant) on 1 August 1943. On 15 August, he was then appointed Staffelkapitän of 3. Staffel of Nachtjagdgeschwader 1 (NJG 1—1st Night Fighter Wing).

Strüning coordinated the introduction of the new Heinkel He 219 "Uhu". On 22 June 1944, he shot down three RAF bombers. Strüning was awarded the Knight's Cross of the Iron Cross with Oak Leaves on 20 July 1944.

On 15 November, Strüning and Leutnant Karl Schnörrer, Oberst Gordon Gollob, Major Georg Christl, Major Rudolf Schoenert, Major Josef Fözö formed the guard of honor at Walter Nowotny funeral at the Zentralfriedhof in Vienna. Nowotny had been killed in action on 8 November 1944. The eulogy was delivered by Generaloberst Otto Deßloch.

At about 6 pm on 24 December 1944 his Messerschmitt Bf 110 G-4 (Werknummer 740 162—factory number) G9+CT was shot down by 10-kill ace F/L R.D. Doleman and F/L D.C. Bunch of No. 157 Squadron RAF  in a de Havilland Mosquito Intruder while he tried to attack a Lancaster bomber over Cologne. He bailed out but struck the tail of his plane and fell to his death. His body was found two months after his death. Strüning was buried at the Ostfriedhof (eastern cemetery) in Westönnen in field X, grave 14.

Summary of career

Aerial victory claims
During his career, Hauptmann Heinz Strüning had made 280 combat missions (250 at night), and claimed 56 victories at night (including two Mosquitoes).

Foreman, Parry and Mathews, authors of Luftwaffe Night Fighter Claims 1939 – 1945, researched the German Federal Archives and found records for 56 nocturnal victory claims. Mathews and Foreman also published Luftwaffe Aces — Biographies and Victory Claims, listing Strüning with 56 aerial victories claimed in 280 combat missions.

Awards
 Iron Cross (1939)
 2nd Class (15 July 1940)
 1st Class (25 November 1940)
 Narvik Shield (30 January 1941)
 Honour Goblet of the Luftwaffe (Ehrenpokal der Luftwaffe) on 12 June 1941 as Feldwebel in a Nachtjagdgeschwader
 German Cross in Gold on 10 July 1942 as Oberfeldwebel in the Ergänzungsstaffel/Nachtjagdgeschwader 2
 Wound Badge in Black (10 September 1943)
 Front Flying Clasp of the Luftwaffe for Night Fighter in Gold with Pennant (31 May 1944)
 Knight's Cross of the Iron Cross with Oak Leaves
 Knight's Cross on 29 October 1942 as Leutnant of the Reserves and pilot in the 3./Nachtjagdgeschwader 1
 528th Oak Leaves on 20 July 1944 as Hauptmann of the Reserves and Staffelkapitän of the 3./Nachtjagdgeschwader 1

Dates of rank

Notes

References

Citations

Bibliography

 
 
 
 
 
 
 
 
 
 
 
 
 
 
 
 
 
 
 
 
 
 
 
 
 
 
 
 
 
 
 
 
 
 
 
 
 
 
 
 
 
 

Luftwaffe pilots
German World War II flying aces
Luftwaffe personnel killed in World War II
Recipients of the Gold German Cross
Recipients of the Knight's Cross of the Iron Cross with Oak Leaves
1912 births
1944 deaths
Military personnel from North Rhine-Westphalia
People from Velbert
Aviators killed by being shot down